Kannankurichi is a part of Salem City Municipal Corporation in Salem district in the Indian state of Tamil Nadu.

Demographics
 India census, Kannankurichi had a population of 16,026. Males constitute 51% of the population and females 49%. Kannankurichi has an average literacy rate of 62%, higher than the national average of 59.5%: male literacy is 70%, and female literacy is 54%. In Kannankurichi, 11% of the population is under 6 years of age.

Connectivity
It is located in near shervarayon hills. Kannankurichi is connected with Salem town bus stand by bus numbers 5 and 5c . share autos connect this township with hasthampatti which is another hub of four roads within Salem. One more new bus of No 5/56 has been launched to connect Kannankurichi and gorimedu.

References

Cities and towns in Salem district
Neighbourhoods in Salem, Tamil Nadu